L. Diane Barnes obtained her Ph.D. in History at West Virginia University and is an associate professor at Youngstown State University. She is the editor-in-chief of the academic journal Ohio History. Barnes is married to Benjamin Barnes.

She is the author, editor or co-editor of several books:
The Irish in Youngstown and the Greater Mahoning Valley, Arcadia, 2004.   
Artisan Workers in the Upper South : Petersburg, Virginia, 1820-1865, Louisiana State University Press, 2008.   
The Old South’s Modern Worlds : Slavery, Region, and Nation in the Age of Progress, with Brian Schoen and Frank Towers. Oxford University Press, 2011.   
Frederick Douglass : Reformer and Statesman, Routledge/Taylor & Francis Group, 2013.  
Frederick Douglass : a Life in Documents, University of Virginia Press, 2013.

References

Year of birth missing (living people)
Living people
West Virginia University alumni
Youngstown State University faculty
21st-century American historians
American women historians
21st-century American women writers